Sídlisko Ťahanovce ([pronunciation: 'seedlisko 'tyahano-utse], literally: "Ťahanovce Housing Estate") is a borough (city ward) of Košice, Slovakia.

Construction of the microdistrict began in May 1985. Today there are more than 20,000 people living in Sídlisko Ťahanovce (1/10 of all Košice's inhabitants). It is the youngest housing estate in Košice, assigned especially for young families.

Sídlisko Ťahanovce is closely connected with the neighbouring, historically older borough of Ťahanovce, which was an independent village until 1969. The first written record about Ťahanovce dates back to 1263. Today it is home to approximately 2,000 (prevailingly elder) people, while the Sídlisko Ťahanovce borough has ten times the population, mainly thanks to its large housing estate.

Statistics
 Area: 
 Population: 22,640 (December 2017)
 Population density: 2,700/km² (December 2017)
 District: Košice I
 Mayor: Mgr. Ing. Miloš Ihnát (as of 2018 elections)

Gallery

References

External links

 Official website of the Sídlisko Ťahanovce borough - Current website.
 Official website of the Sídlisko Ťahanovce borough - Former website (archived).
 Article on the Sídlisko Ťahanovce borough at Cassovia.sk
 Official website of Košice

Boroughs of Košice